Anusara School of Hatha Yoga, also known as Anusara Yoga  (In Hindi:अनुसार योग) is the successor of a modern school of hatha yoga founded by American-born yoga teacher John Friend in 1997.  Friend derived his style from the Iyengar style of yoga and reintroduced elements of Hindu spirituality into a more health-oriented Western approach to Yoga.

Style of yoga

The Anusara style emphasizes a set of Universal Principles of Alignment which underlie all of the physical asanas and are connected to philosophical aspects of the practice. The school's ideology is "grounded in a Tantric philosophy of intrinsic goodness".
The term "Anusara (a-nu-sar-a), means 'flowing with Grace,' 'flowing with Nature' and 'following your heart,'" as interpreted from the Sanskrit  (अनुसार), meaning "custom, usage, natural state or condition".

Instructors who are certified to teach Anusara are exclusively associated with the Anusara School of Hatha Yoga, formed in 2012, after John Friend and Anusara Inc. were embroiled in a scandal that resulted in Friend's stepping down from his role in Anusara. Friend transferred all rights to the name “Anusara” to the newly formed school and dissolved Anusara, Inc.

The Anusara School of Hatha Yoga (ASHY) became a non-profit corporation in 2017 and is recognized as a 501(c)(3) by the United States Internal Revenue Service. It has over 800 teachers worldwide.  ASHY's Vision is "To foster a unified community that inspires and supports all practitioners of Anusara yoga from local to global" and its Mission is "To provide the structure that promotes and sustains the growth of Anusara yoga’s philosophy and methodology."

Founder

John Friend (born May 30, 1959) started practicing yoga postures as shown in the book Integral Yoga Hatha by Swami Satchidananda at age 13. He lived in Ohio until 19 years old, and then moved to Texas. Before becoming a yoga teacher, Friend worked as a financial analyst until he quit in 1986 to teach yoga full-time. In the years following he traveled to California to study with Judith Lasater, and began to focus on Iyengar yoga. Friend was a popular teacher in the Iyengar style and, during the 1990s, served on the board of the Iyengar Yoga Organization for four years before leaving to found Anusara, Inc. in 1997. Since 2012, Friend has had no role in Anusara nor the training and certifying of teachers in the Anusara School of Hatha Yoga.

2012 scandal and exit from Anusara
In February 2012 an anonymous author published online accusations against Friend. The allegations accused Friend of being associated with a Wiccan coven made up of Anusara teachers and employees, and that Friend engaged in sexual relations with women in the coven, several of whom were married. Friend was also accused of de-funding employees' benefits plans without notifying them, and for arranging delivery of marijuana shipped for his own use to Anusara's main office. Friend soon announced his resignation as officer and director of Anusara Inc. In September 2012, Friend returned to teaching a set hatha yoga sequence of 108 asanas called "The Roots" based on Anusara's Universal Principles of Alignment.

References

External links
Anusara yoga site

Yoga schools
Yoga styles